The Bangkok Elevated Road and Train System (BERTS), commonly known as the Hopewell Project (โครงการโฮปเวลล์) after main contractor Hopewell Holdings, was a failed project to build an elevated highway and rail line from central Bangkok to Don Mueang International Airport.  Construction started in 1990, but was suspended by the first government of Anand Panyarachun in 1992, and was finally halted by legal acrimony in 1997 with only 10-13% complete. The project was cancelled in 1998. Due to its resemblance to standing stones, it was comically nicknamed "Thailand's Stonehenge". As of 2021, some idle pillars are still standing and litigation about the project continues.

History
The 80 billion baht (US$3.2 billion) project was approved on 9 November 1990, without a feasibility study or clear timeline for completion, as a joint project of the Thai Ministry of Transport, the State Railway of Thailand (SRT), and the Thai subsidiary of Hopewell Holdings of Hong Kong.<ref name="matichon">"Studying the '7-Generation Project'"(translated from Thai), Matichon, June 7, 2001. The Hopewell Project was signed by MOTC (Mr. Montri Phongphanit), SRT and Hopewell (Thailand) Co.Ltd. (Mr. Gordon Woo) on November 9, 1990 during the tenure of the late Montri Phong Phanit (Minister of MOTC), amid controversial rumours of corruption and unusual land deals. Hopewell had to find financial resources (about 80 billion baht - then US$3.2 billion) to back up the project for the right to develop real estate along the SRT lines. However, there were so many obstacles to deal with--including blueprints, land transfers, the routes which go parallel to other projects, and a financial crunch--that the project bogged down. There were also many committees dealing with the Hopewell project.... After September 1997, Mr. Suwat Liptaphallop (MOTC Minister during the Gen. Chawalit Yopngjaiyut government) sent the issue of the project delay to the cabinet and Mr. Suthep Thueaksubun decided to terminate the project in 1998. Even though several groups offered to revive it, controversies still haunt the project, earning it the nickname "the 7-generation project."</ref>  There were to be three phases: the first a north–south line from Hua Lamphong Railway Station, Bangkok's main train station, to Don Mueang International Airport; the second an east–west line from Taling Chan District to Hua Mak; and the third a spur to the port.  Totaling 60 km, all three were to be built on top of existing SRT train lines.

Rumors of corruption swirled around the project from the outset.  The first part of the project was due to be in operation by December 1995, with the rest completed by December 1999.  However, construction ceased in August 1997 during the Asian financial crisis, with only around 10% complete.  Gordon Wu of Hopewell blamed slow land acquisition on the Thai government, while Thai officials stated that Hopewell had simply run out of money.  Both sides demanded financial compensation and threatened to sue the other for breach of contract, with Hopewell claiming the work had cost it US$575 million. The project was formally terminated by the Cabinet in 1998.

Physical status

The project left over 1,000 concrete pillars standing idle along the planned routes, described by the Bangkok Post'' as "a Bangkok version of Stonehenge". Revivals of the project were proposed periodically by both Hopewell and SRT, but were always shot down by the government of then Prime Minister Thaksin Shinawatra.  According to an Asian Institute of Technology study, the vast majority of the pillars remain structurally sound and in usable condition, and it has been proposed to use them to build an extension of the BTS Skytrain.  Much of the Uttaraphimuk Elevated Tollway on Vibhavadi Rangsit Road parallels the BERTS north–south alignment, with some flyovers since built that obstruct parts of the route.

All of the BERTS east–west line's pillars were demolished from 2005 to 2007 during the construction of the Suvarnabhumi Airport Link, which opened to the public in August 2010.

The alignment of SRT Dark Red Line covers the rest of the BERTS north–south line, and the project has been described as a "Hopewell revival". A section of the Hopewell structure collapsed onto the main northern line on 1 March 2012. A massive concrete slab 50m by 20m collapsed near Wat Samian Nari temple in Chatuchak District.  Demolition of the pillars on the north–south line started in 2013, at a cost of 200 million baht.  After repeated delays, the Dark Red Line eventually opened for trial operation on 2 August 2021, 31 years after the construction of the Hopewell Project started.

Legal status
On 23 April 2019, Thailand's Supreme Administrative Court upheld an arbitration committee's ruling in favour of Hopewell, contractor for the 80 billion baht project killed by the government in 1998. The court ordered SRT to pay Hopewell compensation of 11.88 billion baht, plus 7.5% interest per year. The interest, totaling 13 billion baht, brings the total to nearly 25 billion baht, payable within 180 days.

In October 2019 the transport ministry announced that it will seek a reversal of the Supreme Administrative Court's ruling ordering it and the State Railway of Thailand (SRT) to pay compensation to Hopewell. The ministry will file a lawsuit asking the civil court to look into irregularities that the SRT has uncovered concerning Hopewell's registration as a contract competitor. Hopewell may have been ineligible to win the contract from the outset, according to the transport minister.

On 27 October 2020, the Central Administrative Court upheld the original ruling in favor of Hopewell, making it final; however, on 4 March 2022, the Supreme Administrative Court "ruled in favour of the Ministry of Transport and State Railway of Thailand (SRT) request for a retrial".

References

Transport in Bangkok
Cancelled airport rail links
Unfinished buildings and structures
Rapid transit in Bangkok
Proposed transport infrastructure in Thailand